Farm to Market Roads in Texas are owned and maintained by the Texas Department of Transportation (TxDOT).

RM 2900

Ranch to Market Road 2900 (RM 2900) is located in Llano County.

RM 2900 was designated on August 5, 1966, on the current route.

In October 2018, the RM 2900 bridge across the Llano River collapsed due to heavy flooding. The rebuilt bridge opened in May 2019.

FM 2900

FM 2900 was cancelled on May 12, 1966, and became a portion of FM 2711.

FM 2901

FM 2902

FM 2903

FM 2903 is located in southwestern Reeves County.

The two-lane roadway proceeds to the north, intersecting FM 3334, before trending to the northwest toward Toyah. FM 2903 enters Toyah as South Centre Street and ends at I-20 exit 22.

On July 11, 1968, FM 2903 was extended  over FM 2954. The  segment of FM 2903 between I-10 and SH 17 was designated as part of Business I-10 on November 21, 1991.

FM 2904

FM 2905

FM 2906

Farm to Market Road 2906 (FM 2906) is located in Gregg County. It runs from SH 149 near Lakeport east to the Rusk County line in Easton. It was designated on May 6, 1964, along its current route.

FM 2907

FM 2908

RM 2909

FM 2910

FM 2910 (1964)

On September 5, 1973, the road was extended south . FM 2910 was cancelled on October 28, 1977, and became a portion of FM 2869.

FM 2911

FM 2912

FM 2913

FM 2914

FM 2915

FM 2916

FM 2916 (1964)

The first use of the FM 2916 designation was in Austin County, from FM 331 (now FM 529) near Burleigh northeast  to a county road. FM 2916 was cancelled on April 6, 1970, and became a portion of FM 331.

FM 2916 (1970)

The next use of the FM 2916 designation was in Angelina County, from FM 1475 south  to US 69 near Homer. On November 3, 1972, the road was extended west  to FM 841. FM 2916 was cancelled on November 8, 1977: the section from FM 841 east 1.6 miles was transferred to FM 1475 and the section from US 69 to FM 1475 was transferred to FM 326.

FM 2917

Farm to Market Road 2917 (FM 2917) is located in Brazoria County. It begins at FM 2004 between Hitchcock and Lake Jackson. The route travels to the northwest, running parallel to and crossing branch lines of the Union Pacific Railroad to Monsanto and Solutia factories. Just north of a crossing of the busy Union Pacific main line at Chocolate Bayou, FM 2917 meets  FM 2403 at a three-way stop. FM 2917 continues northwest to its northern terminus at  SH 35 north of Liverpool and southwest of Alvin.

FM 2917 was designated on May 6, 1964, along the current route.

FM 2918

Farm to Market Road 2918 (FM 2918) is located in Brazoria County.

FM 2918 begins at a boat ramp at the Intracoastal Waterway. The two-lane road travels to the northwest, roughly paralleling the San Bernard River and providing access to riverfront communities. The San Bernard National Wildlife Refuge lies along the south side of the road. The route ends at an intersection with FM 2611 near the community of Churchill.

FM 2918 was commissioned on May 6, 1964, from FM 2611 southwest  to the community of McNeel. The  extension to the Intracoastal Waterway was designated on June 1, 1965.

FM 2919

Farm to Market Road 2919 (FM 2919) is located in Fort Bend and Wharton counties. It runs from SH 60 in East Bernard southeast to US 59 in Kendleton. After veering to the southeast for another  the highway crosses the San Bernard River and enters Fort Bend County near the Bay Ridge Christian College. FM 2919 continues to the southeast for another  to Loop 541 and the Union Pacific Railroad in Kendleton. From Loop 541 to the US 59 feeder road and overpass is a short block.

On January 18, 1967, a  section of FM 1164 between SH 60 and the San Bernard River in Wharton County was transferred to FM 2919.

FM 2920

Farm to Market Road 2920 (FM 2920) is located in Harris County. It runs from US 290 Business in Waller east to I-45 in Spring. The highway has an interchange with US 290 and SH 6 in Waller, then heads east and intersects SH 249 and FM 2978 in Tomball before reaching its eastern terminus at I-45. The highway is mostly named Waller–Tomball Road except through Tomball, where the highway follow the city's Main Street.

FM 2920 was designated on May 6, 1964, on a route from US 290 at Waller eastward to FM 149 (now SH 249) at Tomball. It was extended east to I-45 on November 7, 1964.

Junction list

FM 2921

FM 2921 (1964)

FM 2921 was cancelled on December 20, 1965, and transferred to FM 2437.

FM 2922

FM 2923

Farm to Market Road 2923 (FM 2923) is located in San Augustine County. It runs from FM 1277, 2.3 miles south of SH 103, west to Townsend Park.

FM 2923 was designated on October 28, 1966, on the current route. The entire route is also designated as Forest Highway (FH) 39.

FM 2923 (1964)

FM 2923 was cancelled on May 18, 1966, and became a portion of FM 2546.

FM 2924

FM 2925

RM 2925

On June 2, 1967, the road was extended northeast . RM 2925 was cancelled on August 31, 1967, and became a portion of FM 791.

FM 2926

FM 2927

Farm to Market Road 2927 (FM 2927) was located in Shackelford County. No highway currently uses the FM 2927 designation.

FM 2927 was designated on May 6, 1964, from SH 351, 4 miles northeast of the Jones County line, south to the Callahan County line. FM 2927 was cancelled on May 19, 1966, and became a portion of FM 604.

FM 2928

FM 2928 (1964)

On June 1, 1965, the road was extended southeast  to US 277. FM 2928 was cancelled on August 2, 1968, and became a portion of FM 89.

FM 2929

FM 2930

FM 2931

Farm to Market Road 2931 (FM 2931) is located in Denton County.

FM 2931 begins at an intersection with US 380 between Cross Roads and Little Elm near Providence Village. The highway runs in a northern direction and turns east at Liberty Road before turning back north at Brewer Road. FM 2931 runs in a predominately northern direction and intersects FM 428 on the eastern edge of Aubrey. FM 2931 continues to run north before ending at an intersection with Friendship Road northeast of Aubrey.

The highway was extended farther south to SH 24 (now US 380) on May 5, 1966. FM 2931 was extended to the west to US 377 north of Aubrey on November 3, 1972. The section of highway along Friendship Road to US 377 was cancelled on September 5, 1973, and was re-rerouted to the east, ending at FM 1385. The section of FM 2931 along Friendship Road to FM 1385 was cancelled on August 23, 1976.

FM 2932

Farm to Market Road 2932 (FM 2932) is located in Kaufman County.

FM 2932 begins at an intersection with FM 148 southwest of Talty. The highway travels in a northwest direction and meets I-20 near Healms Trail. FM 2932 turns to the west before ending at an intersection with FM 741 southeast of Forney.

FM 2932 was designated on May 6, 1964, along the current route.

Junction list

FM 2933

Farm to Market Road 2933 (FM 2933) is located in Collin County.

FM 2933 begins at an intersection with FM 1827 in New Hope. The highway runs in a western direction before turning north at County Road 332. FM 2933 briefly enters McKinney where it intersects County Road 331 (Woodlawn Road) before turning in a slight northeast direction. The highway zigzags before entering Melissa. FM 2933 intersects FM 545 before ending at an intersection with SH 121.

FM 2933 was designated on May 6, 1964, running from FM 1827 to FM 545. The highway was extended farther north to SH 121 on June 1, 1965.

Junction list

FM 2934

Farm to Market Road 2934 (FM 2934) is located in Denton County.

FM 2934 begins at an intersection with FM 423 in Little Elm. Between FM 423 and Legacy Drive, the highway passes by many newer subdivisions in northern Frisco. FM 2934 then runs near a shopping center before ending at the Dallas North Tollway. The entire route is known locally as Eldorado Parkway.

FM 2934 was designated on May 6, 1964, running from FM 423 eastward to the Denton–Collin county line. The highway was extended to the east to FM 720 on June 1, 1965. The last change came on January 31, 2002, when the section of FM 2934 between Dallas Parkway and FM 720 was removed from the highway system and turned over to the city of Frisco.

FM 2935

FM 2935 (1964)

The first use of the FM 2935 designation was in Upshur County, from FM 553, 0.9 miles northwest of Gilmer, north and southeast to US 271 near Gilmer. FM 2935 was cancelled on May 5, 1966, and removed from the highway system.

FM 2935 (1967)

The next use of the FM 2935 designation was in Cherokee County, from SH 110, 2.4 miles north of Black Jack, northeast to FM 856. FM 2935 was cancelled on October 25, 1969, and removed from the highway system in exchange for the creation of FM 1089, a parallel road to the north.

FM 2936

FM 2937

FM 2938

FM 2939

FM 2940

FM 2941

FM 2942

FM 2943

FM 2943 (1964)

The original FM 2943 was designated on June 22, 1964, from US 67, west of Akin Creek, southeast to US 59, south of Akin Creek. FM 2943 was cancelled on May 26, 1966, and became a portion of FM 2148.

FM 2944

FM 2945

Farm to Market Road 2945 (FM 2945) is a road that runs from just east of Putnam to Cisco along the former route of U.S. Highway 80.

FM 2945 was designated on October 30, 1964, on the current route.

FM 2946

FM 2947

FM 2948

FM 2949

FM 2950

FM 2951

FM 2952

FM 2953

FM 2953 runs from FM 2634 west of Lake Nocona east to FM 677 near Illinois Bend in northern Montague County. The highway parallels the Red River and meets the eastern end of FM 103 northeast of Lake Nocona. The highway was extended in both directions to its present termini on February 20, 1989.

FM 2954

FM 2954 (1965)

FM 2954 was cancelled on August 2, 1968, and became a portion of FM 2903.

FM 2955

FM 2956

FM 2957

FM 2958

FM 2959

FM 2960

FM 2961

FM 2962

FM 2963

Farm to Market Road 2963 (FM 2963) is located in Gregg County. It runs from FM 349 near Lakeport southeast to Cherokee Trail at Lake Cherokee.

FM 2963 was designated on June 1, 1965, along the current route.

FM 2964

Farm to Market Road 2964 (FM 2964) is located in Smith County.

FM 2964 begins at an intersection with FM 346 near Whitehouse. The highway travels in a mostly northern direction through a semi-suburban area, crosses over Loop 49, then enters Tyler near Grande Boulevard. In Tyler, FM 2964 is known locally as Rhones Quarter Road and travels through a residential area, turns east at Shiloh Road, ending at an intersection with SH 110.

FM 2964 was designated on June 1, 1965, along the current route. On June 27, 1995, the route was redesignated Urban Road 2964 (UR 2964). The designation reverted to FM 2964 with the elimination of the Urban Road system on November 15, 2018.

Junction list

FM 2965

Farm to Market Road 2965 (FM 2965) is located in Van Zandt and Kaufman counties.

FM 2965 begins at an intersection with Hiram Road in the Locust Grove area. The highway travels in a northeast direction through rural farming areas, has a junction with I-20, then ends at an intersection with US 80 in Wills Point.

The highway was extended  to Hiram Road on May 5, 1966.

Junction list

FM 2966

FM 2967

FM 2968

FM 2969

RM 2970

Ranch to Market Road 2970 (RM 2970) is located in Henderson County near Athens.

RM 2970 begins at County Road 1116 with the road continuing south as County Road 1113. The highway travels in a slight northeast direction through a heavily forested area and passes the Clements Scout Ranch. RM 2970 turns more towards the northeast before turning north. The highway turns northwest near County Road 1108 before ending at an intersection with FM 753.

RM 2970 was designated on June 2, 1967, along the current route.

FM 2970

RM 2970 was first designated as FM 2970 on June 1, 1965. The highway ran from FM 943 near Segno in Polk County to a point  to the south. On May 18, 1966, FM 2970 was cancelled and combined with FM 2798.

FM 2971

FM 2972

Farm to Market Road 2972 (FM 2972) is located in Cherokee County. Its western terminus is at FM 347 south of Dialville. FM 2972 runs east to Rusk, intersecting FM 343 and passing the Texas Department of Criminal Justice's Hodge Unit, before ending at US 69.

FM 2972 was designated on May 7, 1970, along the current route.

FM 2972 (1965)

A previous route numbered FM 2972 was designated in San Jacinto County on June 1, 1965, running from Shepherd northward . FM 2972 was cancelled on December 12, 1969, and combined with FM 222.

FM 2973

FM 2974

FM 2975

FM 2976

FM 2976 (1965)

FM 2976 was cancelled on May 23, 1966, and became a portion of FM 233.

FM 2977

Farm to Market Road 2977 (FM 2977) is located in Fort Bend County. The highway begins at FM 361 near Fairchilds, goes generally to the northeast and ends at FM 762 a short distance from U.S. Highway 59 (US 59) in Rosenberg. The highway is also named Minonite Road.

FM 2977 starts as a two-lane rural road at a stop sign on FM 361 northwest of Fairchilds in Fort Bend County. From the intersection, the highway goes northeast  to Powerline Road where it curves more toward the north. In this stretch the highway crosses Big Creek. On the east side of the road near Powerline Road is the Big Creek Oil Field. FM 2977 continues straight for  before crossing the BNSF Railway tracks and terminating at a traffic signal at FM 762 in Rosenberg. After Ricefield Road, the highway passes the Walnut Creek subdivision and the aspect becomes less rural. Reading Road and two other streets connect FM 2977 to a large shopping center  to the west at FM 762 and US 59.

The highway was extended an additional  to FM 762 on July 11, 1968.

FM 2978

Farm to Market Road 2978 (FM 2978) is located in Harris and Montgomery counties.

The southern terminus of FM 2978 is at  FM 2920 just east of the Tomball city limits. The road travels north along Hufsmith–Kohrville Road, through the community of Hufsmith and along the western boundary of The Woodlands. The northern terminus is at FM 1488 near the unincorporated community of Egypt.

FM 2978 was designated on June 1, 1965, along the current route.

Junctions

FM 2979

FM 2980

FM 2981

FM 2982

FM 2983

Farm to Market Road 2983 (FM 2983) is located in Harrison County. It runs from FM 2625 south to US 59.

FM 2983 was designated on October 5, 1972, on the current route as a replacement of a section of US 59.

FM 2983 (1965)

The original FM 2983 was designated on June 1, 1965, from SH 95 in Granger westward  to a road intersection. FM 2983 was cancelled on June 6, 1967, and became a portion of FM 971.

FM 2984

FM 2985

FM 2986

FM 2987

FM 2988

FM 2989

FM 2990

FM 2990 (1965)

The original FM 2990 was designated on June 1, 1965, from I-10 and Spur 5 (now FM 1663) north and west  to a county road. FM 2990 was cancelled on May 25, 1966, and became a portion of FM 1663.

FM 2991

FM 2992

FM 2993

FM 2994

RM 2995

FM 2996

FM 2997

FM 2998

FM 2999

References

+29
Farm to market roads 2900
Farm to market roads 2900